Sir Frank Bernard Sanderson, 1st Baronet (4 October 1880 – 18 July 1965) was a British Conservative Party politician and public servant.

During the First World War, Sanderson was Controller of Trench Warfare, National Shell Filling Factories and Stores at the Ministry of Munitions.

He was elected as Member of Parliament (MP) for the Darwen constituency at the 1922 general election, but was defeated at the 1923 general election by the Liberal Frederick Hindle.  He regained the seat from Hindle in 1924, but lost it again at the 1929 general election to the future Liberal leader, Herbert Samuel.

Sanderson did not contest Darwen again, and at the 1931 general election he was returned to Parliament as MP for Ealing. He held that seat until its abolition for the 1945 general election, when was elected in the new Ealing East constituency. He retired from the House of Commons at the 1950 general election.

Sanderson was an advocate of compulsory voting.

Sanderson married Edith Amy Wing in 1904 and had sons Frank and Derek. He was created a baronet, of Malling Deanery in South Malling in the County of Sussex, in the 1920 Birthday Honours for his wartime work.

Footnotes

References 
Obituary, The Times, 19 July 1965

External links 
 
 Parliamentary Archives, Sanderson Press Cuttings and Diaries

1880 births
1965 deaths
Baronets in the Baronetage of the United Kingdom
Conservative Party (UK) MPs for English constituencies
UK MPs 1922–1923
UK MPs 1924–1929
UK MPs 1931–1935
UK MPs 1935–1945
UK MPs 1945–1950
British civil servants